Wales participated in the Junior Eurovision Song Contest in  and . Welsh broadcaster Sianel Pedwar Cymru (S4C) has been responsible for the nation's participation in the contest.

In 2018 and 2019, S4C selected their artist through the televised national final , with the song selected internally. In both years, the competition was held at Venue Cymru in Llandudno.

Although Wales has English as a co-official language, their entries have to be sung in Welsh due to being represented by a Welsh language broadcaster.

History

S4C had also shown interest in participating in the  contest in Limassol, Cyprus, but in the end decided against participating.

S4C announced that they would debut in the  contest on 9 May 2018. The country was represented by the song "Perta" performed by Manw, placing last in a field of 20 songs with 29 points. Wales participated in the  contest, represented by the song "Calon yn Curo" performed by Erin Mai and finished 18th with 35 points.

2019 was the last year Wales participated in the contest. S4C cited the COVID-19 pandemic as the reason for not participating in subsequent editions.

On 25 August 2022, the British Broadcasting Corporation (BBC) announced that the United Kingdom would return to the contest in  after a sixteen-year absence.

Participation overview

Commentators and spokespersons
The Welsh broadcaster, S4C, sent their own commentators to each contest in order to provide commentary in the Welsh language. Spokespersons were also chosen by the national broadcaster in order to announce the awarding points from Wales. The table below list the details of each commentator and spokesperson since 2018.

See also
 Wales in the Eurovision Choir of the Year – A competition organised by the EBU for non-professional choirs.
 United Kingdom in the Eurovision Song Contest – Song contest in which Wales competes as part of the United Kingdom.
 United Kingdom in the Eurovision Song Contest § Separate entrants
 United Kingdom in the Eurovision Dance Contest – Dancing contest in which Wales competed as part of the United Kingdom.
 United Kingdom in the Eurovision Young Dancers – A competition organised by the EBU for dancers aged between 16 and 21, in which Wales competed as part of the United Kingdom.
 United Kingdom in the Eurovision Young Musicians – A competition organised by the EBU for musicians aged up to 18, in which Wales competes as part of the United Kingdom.
 United Kingdom in the Junior Eurovision Song Contest – Song contest for children aged between 9 and 14, in which Wales previously competed as part of the United Kingdom.

References

Wales
Wales in the Eurovision Song Contest
Welsh music